Sergei Nikolayev may refer to:

 Sergei Nikolayev (footballer), Russian football player
 Sergei Nikolayev (ice hockey), Russian ice hockey player
 Sergey Nikolaev (cyclist), Russian cyclist
 Sergey Nikolayev (shot putter) (born 1966), Russian shot putter
 Sergei Nikolaev (linguist), Russian linguist